Rho Herculis (ρ Her, ρ Herculis) is a double star in the constellation of Hercules. The apparent magnitudes of the components are 4.510 and 5.398, respectively. Parallax measurements published in Gaia Data Release 2 put the system at some 360-390 light-years (111-121 parsecs) away.

The two stars of Rho Herculis are separated by four arcseconds, and are known as Rho Herculis A and B, respectively. A is an A-type giant star, while B is a B-type subgiant star. They are also referred to, rarely, as Rho1 Herculis and Rho2 Herculis.

The two visual components have very similar spectral types, between A0 and B9.  Rho Herculis A is generally assigned a giant luminosity class, with Rho Herculis B most often considered to be a main sequence star.  Rho Herculis A has been considered to be an Ap star, with unusually strong silicon or mercury and manganese absorption lines in its spectrum, but this is now considered to be dubious.

References

Hercules (constellation)
A-type giants
B-type subgiants
Double stars
Herculis, Rho
Herculis, 075
Durchmusterung objects
157778 9
085112
6484 5